Frozen is a 2013 American computer-animated musical fantasy film produced by Walt Disney Animation Studios and released by Walt Disney Pictures. The 53rd Disney animated feature film, it is inspired by Hans Christian Andersen's 1844 fairy tale The Snow Queen. The film was directed by Chris Buck and Jennifer Lee and produced by Peter Del Vecho, from a screenplay written by Lee, and a story by Buck, Lee, and Shane Morris. It stars the voices of Kristen Bell, Idina Menzel, Josh Gad, Jonathan Groff and Santino Fontana. Frozen tells the story of Princess Anna as she teams up with an iceman, his reindeer, and a snowman to find her estranged sister Elsa, whose icy powers have inadvertently trapped their kingdom in eternal winter.

Frozen underwent several story treatments before being commissioned in 2011 as a screenplay by Lee. Kristen Anderson-Lopez and Robert Lopez were hired to write the songs for the film, while Christophe Beck composed the score.

Frozen premiered at the El Capitan Theatre in Los Angeles on November 19, 2013, and went into its general theatrical release on November 27. It was praised for its visuals, screenplay, themes, music, and voice acting; some film critics consider Frozen to be Disney's best animated film since the studio's renaissance era. Frozen received two awards at the 86th Academy Awards, and numerous other accolades. It was the first Walt Disney Animation Studios film to win Best Animated Feature.

During its theatrical run, the film was a significant commercial success, earning $1.280 billion in worldwide box office revenue, overtaking Toy Story 3 to become the highest-grossing animated film of all time, and carried its position until it was overtaken by the remake of The Lion King in 2019. It also became the fifth highest-grossing film of all time and the highest-grossing film of 2013. By January 2015, the film became the best-selling Blu-ray Disc in the United States, which resulted in the film launching a franchise, including an animated short in 2015, an animated featurette in 2017, and a feature-length sequel, Frozen II, in November 2019.

Plot 
Princess Elsa of Arendelle possesses magical powers allowing her to control ice and snow, often using them to play with her younger sister Anna. After Elsa accidentally injures Anna with her magic, their parents—the King and Queen—take them to a colony of stone trolls led by Grand Pabbie, who heals Anna but erases her memories of Elsa's magic. Grand Pabbie warns Elsa that she must learn to control her powers, and that fear will be her greatest enemy. The sisters are isolated within the castle, whose gates are closed off to the public. Out of fear of her increasingly unpredictable powers, Elsa ceases all contact with Anna, causing them to become emotionally distant. The King and Queen are lost at sea while the sisters are teenagers and presumed dead.

At the age of 21, Elsa is due to be crowned queen, but fears that her subjects will discover her magic and fear her. The castle gates are opened for the first time in years to the public and visiting dignitaries, including the scheming Duke of Weselton and the handsome Prince Hans of the Southern Isles. Elsa's coronation proceeds without incident, but she remains distant from Anna. Anna and Hans develop a romantic connection during the festivities, and he impulsively proposes to her, but Elsa objects when they seek her blessing. Hurt and confused, Anna protests, begging Elsa to explain her fear and isolation. The emotional strain causes Elsa to accidentally unleash her powers before the court. Branded a monster by the Duke, Elsa flees to the North Mountain, where she finally acknowledges her powers, building an ice palace to live a hermit life. Unbeknownst to Elsa, her magic has caused Arendelle to fall under an eternal winter.

Anna ventures to find Elsa and end the winter, leaving Hans in command. After getting lost, she meets an iceman named Kristoff and his reindeer Sven, recruiting them to take her to the mountains. An attack by wolves damages Kristoff's sleigh beyond repair. Forced to continuing the journey on foot, Anna and Kristoff meet Olaf, a talking snowman unknowingly created by Elsa, who offers to guide them to her. When Anna's horse reports back to Arendelle without her, Hans sets out to find her along with the Duke's minions, whom the Duke secretly gives orders to kill Elsa.

When Anna reaches the ice palace and reveals to Elsa what has become of Arendelle, a horrified Elsa confesses she does not know how to undo her magic. Her fear causes her powers to manifest themselves once more, and she accidentally freezes Anna's heart, mortally injuring her. In desperation to keep Anna safe, Elsa creates a giant snow monster named Marshmallow, who chases Anna, Kristoff and Olaf away. Realizing the effects of Elsa's spell on Anna, Kristoff takes her to the trolls, his adoptive family. Grand Pabbie reveals that Anna will freeze solid unless "an act of true love" reverses the spell. Kristoff and Olaf race Anna back home so Hans can give her true love's kiss. Hans and his men reach Elsa's palace, defeating Marshmallow, who falls into a chasm, and capturing Elsa.

Anna is delivered to Hans, but rather than kissing her, Hans reveals he was actually planning to seize the throne of Arendelle by eliminating both sisters. Hans locks a heartbroken Anna in a room to die and then manipulates the dignitaries and the Duke into believing that she died from Elsa's spell. He orders the queen's execution, only to discover she has escaped her detention cell. Anna is freed by Olaf, and they venture into the blizzard outside to meet Kristoff, whom Olaf has revealed is in love with her. Hans confronts Elsa outside, claiming that she killed Anna, causing Elsa to break down and abruptly stop the storm. Moments before Hans can kill Elsa, Anna leaps in the way and freezes solid, stopping Hans. Devastated, Elsa hugs and mourns over her sister, who thaws out, her heroism constituting "an act of true love".

Realizing that love is the key to controlling her magic, Elsa dispels the eternal winter, and gives Olaf a furry small cloud to experience warmth. Hans is arrested and banished from Arendelle for his treason while Elsa cancels the trade agreement with Weselton to get back at the Duke. Anna gives Kristoff a new sleigh and the two kiss. The sisters are reunited, and Elsa promises never to lock the castle gates again.

In a post-credits scene, Marshmallow, having survived the fall, finds Elsa's discarded crown and places it on top of its head.

Voice cast 

 Kristen Bell as Anna, the 18-year-old Princess of Arendelle and Elsa's younger sister
 Bell also voices 15-year-old Anna.
 Livvy Stubenrauch as 5-year-old Anna
 Katie Lopez as 5-year-old Anna (singing)
 Agatha Lee Monn as 9-year-old Anna
 Idina Menzel as Elsa, the 21-year-old Queen of Arendelle who possesses magical ice powers and Anna's elder sister
 Menzel also voices 18-year-old Elsa.
 Eva Bella as 8-year-old Elsa
 Spencer Lacey Ganus as 12-year-old Elsa
 Jonathan Groff as Kristoff, a 21-year-old iceman who is accompanied by a reindeer named Sven
 Tyree Brown as 8-year-old Kristoff
 Josh Gad as Olaf, a sentient comic-relief snowman that Elsa and Anna created as children, who dreams of experiencing summer
 Santino Fontana as Hans, a prince from the Southern Isles
 Alan Tudyk as the Duke of Weselton
 Ciarán Hinds as Grand Pabbie, the Troll King
 Chris Williams as Oaken, the owner of Wandering Oaken's Trading Post and Sauna
 Maia Wilson as Bulda, a troll and Kristoff's adoptive mother
 Paul Briggs as Marshmallow, a giant snow monster who guards Elsa's palace
 Maurice LaMarche as the King of Arendelle, Anna and Elsa's father
 Jennifer Lee as the Queen of Arendelle, Anna and Elsa's mother

Non-speaking characters include Kristoff's reindeer companion Sven, horses, and wolves. The grunts and snorts for Sven were provided by Frank Welker who was not credited in the film.

Production

Conception and early attempts to adapt The Snow Queen 

In March 1940, Walt Disney suggested a co-production to film producer Samuel Goldwyn, where his studio would shoot the live-action sequences of Hans Christian Andersen's life and Disney's studio would animate Andersen's fairy tales. The animated sequences would be based on some of Andersen's best-known works, such as The Little Mermaid, The Little Match Girl, The Steadfast Tin Soldier, The Snow Queen, Thumbelina, The Ugly Duckling, The Red Shoes, and The Emperor's New Clothes. However, the studio encountered difficulty with The Snow Queen, as it could not find a way to adapt and relate the Snow Queen character to modern audiences.

After the United States entered World War II, Disney focused on making wartime propaganda, which caused development on the Disney–Goldwyn project to grind to a halt in 1942. Goldwyn went on to produce his own live-action film version in 1952, entitled Hans Christian Andersen, with Danny Kaye as Andersen, Charles Vidor directing, Moss Hart writing, and Frank Loesser penning the songs. All of Andersen's fairy tales were, instead, told in song and ballet in live-action, like the rest of the film. It went on to receive six Academy Award nominations the following year. Back at Disney, The Snow Queen, along with other Andersen fairy tales (including The Little Mermaid), were shelved.

In the late 1990s, Walt Disney Feature Animation started developing a new adaptation of The Snow Queen after the tremendous success of their recent films during the Disney Renaissance era (1989–1999), but the project was scrapped completely in late 2002, when Glen Keane reportedly quit the project and went on to work on another project which became Tangled (2010). Even before then, Harvey Fierstein pitched his version of the story to Disney's executives, but was turned down. Paul and Gaëtan Brizzi, Dick Zondag and Dave Goetz reportedly all tried their hand at it, but failed. After a number of unsuccessful attempts from 2000 to 2002, Disney shelved the project again. During one of those attempts, Michael Eisner, then-chairman and chief executive officer of The Walt Disney Company, offered his support to the project and suggested doing it with Oscar-winning director John Lasseter at Pixar after the then-expected renewal of Pixar's contract with Disney. But negotiations between Pixar and Disney collapsed in January 2004 and that contract was never renewed. Instead, Eisner's successor Bob Iger negotiated Disney's purchase of Pixar in January 2006 for $7.4 billion, and Lasseter was promoted to chief creative officer of both Pixar and Disney Animation.

Development 
Development of Frozen began in 2008, when Lasseter was able to convince Chris Buck (who co-directed the 1999 film Tarzan for the studio) to return to Walt Disney Animation Studios from Sony Pictures Animation (where he had recently co-directed the Oscar-nominated 2007 film Surf's Up); that September, Buck pitched several ideas to Lasseter, one of which was The Snow Queen. Buck later revealed that his initial inspiration for The Snow Queen was not the Andersen fairy tale itself, but that he wanted "to do something different on the definition of true love." "Disney had already done the 'kissed by a prince' thing, so [I] thought it was time for something new," he recalled. It turned out Lasseter had been interested in The Snow Queen for a long time; back when Pixar was working with Disney on Toy Story in the 1990s, he saw and was "blown away" by some of the pre-production art from Disney's prior attempts. Development began under the title Anna and the Snow Queen, which was planned to be traditionally animated. According to Josh Gad, he first became involved with the film at that early stage, when the plot was still relatively close to the original Andersen fairy tale and Megan Mullally was going to play Elsa. By early 2010, the project entered development hell once again, when the studio again failed to find a way to make the story and the Snow Queen character work.

Resurgence 
On December 22, 2011, following the success of Tangled, Disney announced a new title for the film, Frozen, and a release date of November 27, 2013. A month later, it was confirmed that the film would be a computer-animated feature in stereoscopic 3D, instead of the originally intended hand-drawn animation due to complex elements in the script regarding strong visuals. Kristen Anderson-Lopez and Robert Lopez joined the project and started writing songs for Frozen in January 2012. On March 5, 2012, it was announced that Buck would be directing, with Lasseter and Peter Del Vecho producing.

After Disney decided to advance The Snow Queen into development again, one of the main challenges Buck and Del Vecho faced was the character of the Snow Queen, who was then a villain in their drafts. The studio has a tradition of screening animated films in development every twelve weeks, then holding lengthy "notes sessions" in which its directors and screenwriters from different projects provide extensive "notes" on each other's work.

Buck and Del Vecho presented their storyboards to Lasseter, and the entire production team adjourned to a conference to hear his thoughts on the project. Art director Michael Giaimo later acknowledged Lasseter as the "game changer" of the film: "I remember John saying that the latest version of The Snow Queen story that Chris Buck and his team had come up with was fun, very light-hearted. But the characters didn't resonate. They aren't multi-faceted. Which is why John felt that audiences wouldn't really be able to connect with them."

The production team then addressed the film's problems, drafting several variations on The Snow Queen story until the characters and story felt relevant. At that stage, the first major breakthrough was the decision to rewrite the film's protagonist, Anna (who was based on the Gerda character from The Snow Queen), as the younger sibling of Elsa, thereby effectively establishing a family dynamic between the characters. This was unusual in that relationships between sisters are rarely used as a major plot element in American animated films, with the notable exception of Disney's Lilo & Stitch (2002). To fully explore the unique dynamics of such relationships, Disney Animation convened a "Sister Summit," at which women from all over the studio who grew up with sisters were asked to discuss their relationships with their sisters.

Writing 
In March 2012, Jennifer Lee, one of the writers of Wreck-It Ralph, was brought in as screenwriter. Before Lee was brought on board, the efforts of the previous screen and songwriters had "imploded", which allowed the songwriters "to put a lot of [their] DNA" into the new script. The production team "essentially started over and ... had 17 months," which resulted in a very "intense schedule" and implied "a lot of choices had to be made fast".

While developing the story, Jennifer Lee and Chris Buck drew influence from several sources. They said the biggest influence on the film was the country of Norway, when the art department visited the country, drawing inspiration from the country's culture and environment. They also cited the influence of several films, including Hayao Miyazaki's anime productions along with the David Lean productions Lawrence of Arabia (1962) and Doctor Zhivago (1965), stating that they were inspired by their sense of "epic adventure and that big scope and scale and then the intimacy of funny quirky characters."

According to Lee, several core concepts were already in place, such as the film's "frozen heart" hook: "That was a concept and the phrase ... an act of true love will thaw a frozen heart." They already knew the ending involved true love in the sense of the emotional bond between siblings, not romance, in that "Anna was going to save Elsa. We didn’t know how or why." Lee said Edwin Catmull, president of Disney Animation, told her early on about the film's ending: ".. you have to earn that ending. If you do[,] it will be great. If you don't, it will suck". However, the final version differed sharply from the earlier ones. In the original, Elsa had been evil from the start, kidnapping Anna from her own wedding to intentionally freeze her heart and later descending upon the town with an army of snowmen. "The whole second act was about Anna trying to get to Hans and to kiss him and then Elsa trying to stop her". Buck revealed that the original plot attempted to make Anna sympathetic by focusing on her frustration as the "spare" in relation to the "heir". The pacing of the revised plot focused on musical comedy with less action and adventure.

A breakthrough was the composition of the song "Let It Go" by Lopez and Anderson-Lopez, which forced a reimagining of Elsa as a more complex, vulnerable, and sympathetic character. In The Daily Telegraphs words, the songwriters saw Elsa not as a villain but as "a scared girl struggling to control and come to terms with her gift". "Bobby and Kristen...started talking about what would it feel like [to be Elsa]", Lee said.  "And this concept of letting out who she is[,] that she's kept to herself for so long[,] and she's alone and free, but then the sadness of the fact  that the last moment is she's alone". Del Vecho explained that "Let It Go" changed Elsa into a person "ruled by fear and Anna was ruled by her own love of other people and her own drive", which caused Lee to "rewrite the first act and then that rippled through the entire movie. So that was when we really found the movie and who these characters were".

Another breakthrough was developing the plot twist that Prince Hans, having not even been in the first drafts, would be revealed as the true villain only near the end. Del Vecho said, "if we were going to make the ending so surprising[,] you had to believe at one point that Hans was the answer ... [when] he's not the answer, it's Kristoff ... [I]f you can get the audience to leap ahead and think they have figured it out[,] you can surprise them by turning it the other way". Lee acknowledged that Hans was written as "sociopathic" and "twisted". "It was difficult to lay the foundation for Anna's belated turn to Kristoff without also making Hans' betrayal of Anna too predictable, in that the audience had to "feel ... her feeling something but not quite understanding it ... Because the minute it is [understood,] it deflated." In earlier drafts, Anna openly flirted with Kristoff at their first meeting, but that was changed after Walt Disney Studios chairman Alan Horn pointed out that it would confuse and annoy viewers, since Anna was already engaged to Hans.

Lee had to work through how to write Anna's personality; some of her colleagues felt Anna should be more dysfunctional and co-dependent. Lee disagreed, but it took her almost a year to convincingly articulate "this is what Anna's journey is. No more than that. No less than that." In the end, Lee successfully argued for a simple coming-of-age story, "where she goes from having a naive view of life and love – because she's lonely – to the most sophisticated and mature view of love, where she's capable of the ultimate love, which is sacrifice". Lee also had to let go of ideas that she liked, such as a scene portraying Anna and Elsa's relationship as teenagers, because they needed to maintain the separation between Anna and Elsa. To construct Anna and Elsa's relationship, Lee found inspiration from her own relationship with her older sister. Lee called her older sister "my Elsa" in an op-ed in the Los Angeles Times, and walked the red carpet with her at the 86th Academy Awards. Lee explained, "[h]aving to ... lose each other and then rediscover each other as adults, that was a big part of my life".

The team also turned Olaf from Elsa's obnoxious sidekick into Anna's comically innocent one. Lee's initial response to the original "mean" version of Olaf had been, "Kill the f-ing snowman", and she found Olaf by far "the hardest character to deal with". The problem of how Anna would save Elsa at the climax was solved by story artist John Ripa. At the story meeting where Ripa pitched his take on the story, Lasseter said, "I've never seen anything like that before", followed by a standing ovation. Along the way, the team abandoned a lot of the detail of earlier drafts, such as a troll with a Brooklyn accent to explain the backstory behind Elsa's magical powers, and a regent for whom Lee was hoping to cast comedian Louis C.K. These were excised because they amounted to a "much more complex story than really we felt like we could fit in this 90-minute film". As Del Vecho put it, "the more we tried to explain things at the beginning, the more complicated it got".

Given Lee's extensive involvement in the development process, she was promoted to co-director by studio heads Lasseter and Catmull in August 2012, which was announced that November, making Lee the first woman to direct a full-length animated film from Walt Disney Animation Studios. Lee later said that she was "really moved by a lot of what Chris had done" and that they "shared a vision" of the story, having "very similar sensibilities".

By November 2012, the team thought they had finally "cracked" the film's story, but according to Del Vecho, in late February 2013 it was realized that it still "wasn't working", which necessitated more rewriting from February through June 2013. He explained, "we rewrote songs, we took out characters and changed everything, and suddenly the movie gelled. But that was close. In hindsight, piece of cake, but during, it was a big struggle." Looking back, Anderson-Lopez joked she and Lopez thought they could have ended up working as "birthday party clown[s]" if the final product "pull[ed] ... down" their careers and recalled that "we were really writing up until the last minute". In June (five months before the announced release date), the songwriters finally got the film working when they composed the song "For the First Time in Forever", which, in Lopez's words, "became the linchpin of the whole movie". That month, Disney conducted test screenings of the part-completed film with two audiences (one of families and the other of adults) in Phoenix, Arizona, at which Lasseter and Catmull were present. Lee recalled that it was the moment when they realized they "had something, because the reaction was huge". Catmull told her afterwards, "you did it".

Casting 
Actress Kristen Bell was cast as the voice of Anna on March 5, 2012. The filmmakers listened to a series of vocal tracks Bell had recorded when she was young, in which she performed several songs from The Little Mermaid, including "Part of Your World". Bell completed her Frozen recording sessions while she was pregnant, and rerecorded some lines after her pregnancy, as her voice had deepened. Bell was called in to re-record dialogue for the film "probably 20 times," which is normal for lead roles in Disney animated films whose scripts are still evolving. As for her approach to the role of Anna, Bell enthused that she had "dreamed of being in a Disney animated film" since she was four years old, saying, "I always loved Disney animation, but there was something about the females that was unattainable to me. Their posture was too good and they were too well-spoken, and I feel like I really made this girl much more relatable and weirder and scrappier and more excitable and awkward. I'm really proud of that."

Idina Menzel, a Broadway veteran, was cast as Elsa. Menzel had formerly auditioned for Tangled, but did not get the part. However, Tangleds casting director, Jamie Sparer Roberts, preserved a recording of Menzel's performance on her iPhone, and on the basis of that, asked her to audition along with Bell for Frozen. Before they were officially cast, Menzel and Bell deeply impressed the directors and producers at an early table read; after reading the entire script out loud, they sang "Wind Beneath My Wings" together as a duet, since no music had been composed yet. Bell had suggested that idea when she visited Menzel at her California home to prepare together for the table read. The songwriters were also present for the table read; Anderson-Lopez said "Lasseter was in heaven" upon hearing Menzel and Bell sing in harmony, and from that moment forward, he insisted, "Kristen Bell and Idina Menzel have to be in the movie!" Lee said, "They sung  it like sisters and what you mean to me[,] [a]nd there wasn't a dry eye in the house after they sang." Between December 2012 and June 2013, the casting of additional roles was announced, including Jonathan Groff as Kristoff, Alan Tudyk as the Duke of Weselton, Santino Fontana as Prince Hans, and Josh Gad as Olaf.

Animation 
Similar to Tangled, Frozen employed a unique artistic style by blending together features of both computer-generated imagery (CGI) and traditional hand-drawn animation. From the beginning, Buck knew Giaimo was the best candidate to develop the style he had in mind – which would draw from the best Disney hand-drawn films of the 1950s, the Disney Little Golden Books, and mid-century modern design – and persuaded him to come back to Disney to serve as the art director for Frozen. Buck, Lasseter, and Giaimo were all old friends who had first met at the California Institute of the Arts, and Giaimo had previously served as the art director for Disney's Pocahontas (1995), which Buck had worked on as a supervising animator.

To create the look of Frozen, Giaimo began pre-production research by reading extensively about the entire region of Scandinavia and visiting the Danish-themed city of Solvang near Los Angeles, but eventually zeroed in on Norway in particular because "80 percent" of the visuals that appealed to him were from Norway. Disney eventually sponsored three research field trips. Animators and special effects specialists were dispatched to Jackson Hole, Wyoming, to experience walking, running, and falling in deep snow in a variety of types of attire, including long skirts (which both female and male personnel tried on); while lighting and arts teams visited an Ice Hotel in Quebec City, Quebec to study how light reflects and refracts on snow and ice. Finally, Giaimo and several artists traveled to Norway to draw inspiration from its mountains, fjords, architecture, and culture. "We had a very short time schedule for this film, so our main focus was really to get the story right but we knew that John Lasseter is keen on truth in the material and creating a believable world, and again that doesn't mean it's a realistic world – but a believable one. It was important to see the scope and scale of Norway, and important for our animators to know what it's like," Del Vecho said. "There is a real feeling of Lawrence of Arabia scope and scale to this," he finished.

During 2012, while Giaimo and the animators and artists conducted preparatory research and developed the film's overall look, the production team was still struggling to develop a compelling script, as explained above. That problem was not adequately solved until November 2012, and the script would later require even more significant revisions after that point. As a result, the single "most daunting" challenge facing the animation team was a short schedule of less than 12 months to turn Lee's still-evolving shooting script into an actual film. Other films like Pixar's Toy Story 2 had been successfully completed on even shorter schedules, but a short schedule necessarily meant "late nights, overtime, and stress." Lee estimated the total size of the entire team on Frozen to be around 600 to 650 people, "including around 70 lighting people[,] 70-plus animators," and 15 to 20 storyboard artists.

Del Vecho explained how the film's animation team was organized: "On this movie we do have character leads, supervising animators on specific characters. The animators themselves may work on multiple characters but it's always under one lead. I think it was different on Tangled, for example, but we chose to do it this way as we wanted one person to fully understand and develop their own character and then be able to impart that to the crew. Hyrum Osmond, the supervising animator on Olaf, is quiet but he has a funny, wacky personality so we knew he'd bring a lot of comedy to it; Anna's animator, Becky Bresee, it's her first time leading a character and we wanted her to lead Anna." Acting coach Warner Loughlin was brought in to help the film's animators understand the characters they were creating. In order to get the general feeling of each scene, some animators did their own acting. "I actually film myself acting the scene out, which I find very helpful," said animation supervisor Rebecca Wilson Bresee. This helped her discover elements that made the scene feel real and believable. Elsa's supervising animator was Wayne Unten, who asked for that role because he was fascinated by the complexity of the character. Unten carefully developed Elsa's facial expressions in order to bring out her fear as contrasted against Anna's fearlessness. He also studied videos from Menzel's recording sessions and animated Elsa's breathing to match Menzel's breathing. Head of Animation, Lino DiSalvo, said, "The goal for the film was to animate the most believable CG characters you've ever seen."

Regarding the look and nature of the film's cinematography, Giaimo was greatly influenced by Jack Cardiff's work in Black Narcissus (1947). According to him, it lent a hyper-reality to the film: "Because this is a movie with such scale and we have the Norwegian fjords to draw from, I really wanted to explore the depth. From a design perspective, since I was stressing the horizontal and vertical aspects, and what the fjords provide, it was perfect. We encased the sibling story in scale." Ted D. McCord's work in The Sound of Music was another major influence for Giaimo. It was also Giaimo's idea that Frozen should be produced in the CinemaScope widescreen process, which was approved by Lasseter. This made Frozen the first animated film to be completely produced in CinemaScope since 2000's Titan A.E.. Giaimo also wanted to ensure that Norway's fjords, architecture and rosemaling folk art, were critical factors in designing the environment of Arendelle. Giaimo, whose background is in traditional animation, said that the art design environment represents a unity of character and environment and that he originally wanted to incorporate saturated colors, which is typically ill-advised in computer animation. For further authenticity, a live reindeer named Sage was brought into the studio for animators to study its movements and mannerisms for the character Sven.

Another important issue Giaimo insisted on addressing was costumes, in that he "knew from the start" it would be a "costume film." To realize that vision, he brought in character designer Jean Gillmore to act as a dedicated "costume designer". While traditional animation simply integrates costume design with character design and treats clothing as merely part of the characters, computer-generated animation regards costume as almost a separate entity with its own properties and behaviors – and Frozen required a level of as-yet untried detail, down to minutiae like fabrics, buttons, trim, and stitching. Gillmore explained that her "general approach was to meld the historic silhouettes of 1840 Western Europe (give or take), with the shapes and garment relationships and details of folk costume in early Norway, circa 19th century." This meant using primarily wool fabric with accents of velvet, linen, and silk. During production, Giaimo and Gillmore "ran around" supplying various departments with real-world samples to use as references; they were able to draw upon both the studio's own in-house library of fabric samples and the resources of Walt Disney Parks and Resorts' costume division in Fullerton, California. The film's "look development artists" (the Disney job title for texture artists) created the digitally painted simulation of the appearance of surfaces, while other departments dealt with movement, rigging and weight, thickness and lighting of textile animation.

During production, the film's English title was changed from The Snow Queen to Frozen, a decision that drew comparisons to another Disney film, Tangled. Peter Del Vecho explained that "the title Frozen came up independently of the title Tangled. It's because, to us, it represents the movie. Frozen plays on the level of ice and snow but also the frozen relationship, the frozen heart that has to be thawed. We don't think of comparisons between Tangled and Frozen, though." He also mentioned that the film will still retain its original title, The Snow Queen, in some countries: "because that just resonated stronger in some countries than Frozen. Maybe there's a richness to The Snow Queen in the country's heritage and they just wanted to emphasize that."

Technology development 

The studio also developed several new tools to generate realistic and believable shots, particularly the heavy and deep snow and its interactions with the characters. Disney wanted an "all-encompassing" and organic tool to provide snow effects but not require switching between different methods. As noted above, several Disney artists and special effects personnel traveled to Wyoming to experience walking through deep snow. Dr. Kenneth Libbrecht, a professor from the California Institute of Technology, was invited to give lectures to the effects group on how snow and ice form, and why snowflakes are unique. Using this knowledge, the effects group created a snowflake generator that allowed them to randomly create 2,000 unique snowflake shapes for the film.

Another challenge that the studio had to face was to deliver shots of heavy and deep snow that both interacted believably with characters and had a realistic sticky quality. According to principal software engineer Andrew Selle, "[Snow]'s not really a fluid. It’s not really a solid. It breaks apart. It can be compressed into snowballs. All of these different effects are very difficult to capture simultaneously." In order to achieve this, software engineers used advanced mathematics (the material point method) and physics, with assistance from mathematics researchers at the University of California, Los Angeles to create a snow simulator software application called Matterhorn. The tool was capable of depicting realistic snow in a virtual environment and was used in at least 43 scenes in the film, including several key sequences. Software engineer Alexey Stomakhin referred to snow as "an important character in the film," therefore it attracted special attention from the filmmakers. "When you stretch it, snow will break into chunks. Since snow doesn't have any connections, it doesn't have a mesh, it can break very easily. So that was an important property we took advantage of," explained Selle. "There you see [Kristoff] walking through and see his footprints breaking the snow into little pieces and chunk up and you see [Anna] being pulled out and the snow having packed together and broken into pieces. It's very organic how that happens. You don't see that they're pieces already – you see the snow as one thing and then breaking up." The tool also proved to be particularly useful in scenes involving characters walking through deep snow, as it ensured that the snow reacted naturally to each step.

Other tools designed to help artists complete complicated effects included Spaces, which allowed Olaf's deconstructible parts to be moved around and rebuilt, Flourish, which allowed extra movement such as leaves and twigs to be art-directed; Snow Batcher, which helped preview the final look of the snow, especially when characters were interacting with an area of snow by walking through a volume, and Tonic, which enabled artists to sculpt their characters' hair as procedural volumes. Tonic also aided in animating fur and hair elements such as Elsa's hair, which contains 420,000 computer-generated strands, while the average number for a real human being is only 100,000. The number of character rigs in Frozen is 312 and the number of simulated costumes also reached 245 cloth rigs, which were far beyond all other Disney films to date. Fifty effects artists and lighting artists worked together on the technology to create "one single shot" in which Elsa builds her ice palace. Its complexity required 30 hours to render each frame, with 4,000 computers rendering one frame at a time.

Besides 3D effects, the filmmakers also used 2D artwork and drawings for specific elements and sequences in the film, including Elsa's magic and snow sculptures, as well as freezing fountains and floors. The effects group created a "capture stage" where the entire world of Frozen gets displayed on monitors, which can be "filmed" on special cameras to operate a three-dimensional scene. "We can take this virtual set that's mimicking all of my actions and put it into any one of our scenes in the film," said technology manager Evan Goldberg.

Scandinavian and Sámi inspiration 
The setting is the fictional kingdom of Arendelle which was principally based on Norway, and the cultural influences in the film come from Scandinavian culture. Several landmarks in Norway appear in the film, including the Akershus Fortress in Oslo, the Nidaros Cathedral in Trondheim, and Bryggen in Bergen. Numerous other typical cultural Scandinavian elements are also included in the film, such as stave churches, trolls, Viking ships, a hot spring, Fjord horses, clothes, and food such as lutefisk. A maypole is also present in the film, as well as the brief appearance of runes in a book that Anna and Elsa's father opens to figure out where the trolls live. A scene where two men argue over whether to stack firewood bark up or bark down is a reference to the perennial Norwegian debate over how to stack firewood properly. The film also contains several elements specifically drawn from Sámi culture, such as the usage of reindeer for transportation and the equipment used to control these, clothing styles (the outfits of the ice cutters), and parts of the musical score. Decorations, such as those on the castle pillars and Kristoff's sled, are also in styles inspired by Sámi duodji decorations. During their field work in Norway, Disney's team, for inspiration, visited Rørosrein, a Sámi family-owned company in the village Plassje that produces reindeer meat and arranges tourist events. Arendelle was inspired by Nærøyfjord, a branch of Norway's longest fjord Sognefjorden, which has been listed as a UNESCO World Heritage Site; while a castle in Oslo with beautiful hand-painted patterns on all four walls served as the inspiration for the kingdom's royal castle interior.

The filmmakers' trip to Norway provided essential knowledge for the animators to come up with the design aesthetic for the film in terms of color, light, and atmosphere. According to Giaimo, there were three important factors that they had acquired from the Norway research trip: the fjords and the massive vertical rock formations characteristic of fjords, which serve as the setting for the secluded kingdom of Arendelle; the medieval stave churches, whose rustic triangular rooflines and shingles inspired the castle compound; and the rosemaling folk art, whose distinctive paneling and grid patterns informed the architecture, decor, and costumes.

Music and sound design 

The songs for Frozen were written and composed by the husband-and-wife songwriting team of Robert Lopez and Kristen Anderson-Lopez, both of whom had previously worked with Disney Animation on Winnie the Pooh (2011) (also produced by Del Vecho, who then hired them for Frozen) and before that, with Disney Parks on Finding Nemo – The Musical (2007). Lopez first heard Disney Animation's pitch while in Los Angeles working on The Book of Mormon, but Disney was so eager to get both of them on board that the production team traveled to New York City to also pitch the film in person to Anderson-Lopez (who was busy raising the couple's two young daughters). Lopez believes Disney was particularly interested in his wife's strong story talent. The decision, of course, was easy: "Whenever Disney asks if you want to do a fairy tale musical, you say yes."

About 23 minutes of the film are dedicated to their musical numbers. Because they live in New York City, collaborating closely with the production team in Burbank required two-hour-long transcontinental videoconferences nearly every weekday for about 14 months. For each song they composed, they recorded a demo in their home studio (with both of them singing the lyrics and Lopez accompanying on piano), then emailed it to Burbank for discussion at the next videoconference. Lopez and Anderson-Lopez were aware of the fact that their work would be compared to that of Alan Menken and Howard Ashman from the Disney Renaissance era, and whenever they felt lost, they asked "What would Ashman do?" In the end, they wrote 25 songs for the film, of which eight made it into the final version. One song ("For the First Time in Forever") had a reprise and the other ("Let It Go") was covered by Demi Lovato over the final credits, for a total of ten songs. Seven of the 17 that did not make it were later released on the deluxe edition soundtrack.

In February 2013, Christophe Beck was hired to score the film, following his work on Paperman, a Disney animated short film released the year prior to Frozen. It was revealed on September 14, 2013, that Sámi musician Frode Fjellheim's Eatnemen Vuelie would be the film's opening song, as it contains elements of the traditional Sámi singing style joik. The music producers recruited Norwegian linguist and composer Christine Hals to assist with the lyrics for an Old Norse song written for Elsa's coronation and traveled to Trondheim, Norway, to record the all-female choir Cantus, for a piece inspired by traditional Sámi music.

Under the supervision of sound engineer David Boucher, the lead cast members began recording the film's vocal tracks in October 2012 at the Sunset Sound recording studio in Hollywood before the songs had been orchestrated, meaning they heard only Lopez's demo piano track in their headphones as they sang. Most of the dialogue was recorded at the Roy E. Disney Animation Building in Burbank under the supervision of original dialogue mixer Gabriel Guy, who also mixed the film's sound effects. Some dialogue was recorded after recording songs at both Sunset Sound and Capitol Studios; for scenes involving Anna and Elsa, both studios offered vocal isolation booths where Menzel and Bell could read dialogue with line-of-sight with one another, while avoiding "bleedthrough" between their respective tracks. Additional dialogue was recorded at an ADR facility on the Walt Disney Studios lot in Burbank (across the street from the Disney Animation building) and at the Soundtrack Group's New York studio, since the production team had to work around the busy schedules of the film's New York-based cast members like Fontana.

Lopez and Anderson-Lopez's piano-vocal scores for the songs along with the vocal tracks were sent to Salem, Oregon-based Dave Metzger for arrangement and orchestration; Metzger also orchestrated a significant portion of Beck's score.

For the orchestral film score, Beck paid homage to the Norway- and Sápmi-inspired setting by employing regional instruments, such as the bukkehorn, and traditional vocal techniques, such as kulning. Beck worked with Lopez and Anderson-Lopez on incorporating their songs into arrangements in the score. The trio's goal "was to create a cohesive musical journey from beginning to end." Similarly, Beck's scoring mixer, Casey Stone (who also supervised the recording of the score), worked with Boucher to align their microphone setups to ensure the transitions between the songs and score were seamless, even though they were separately recorded on different dates. The final orchestrations of both the songs and score were all recorded at the Eastwood Scoring Stage on the Warner Bros. Pictures studio lot in Burbank by an 80-piece orchestra, featuring 32 vocalists, including native Norwegian Christine Hals. Hals performed kulning for Beck to use it in the score whenever Elsa misuses her magical powers. Boucher supervised the recording of Anderson-Lopez and Lopez's songs from July 22 to 24, 2013, then Stone supervised the recording of Beck's score from September 3 to 6 and 9 to 10. Boucher mixed the songs at the Eastwood stage, while Stone mixed the score at Beck's personal studio in Santa Monica, California.

Regarding the sound of Frozen, director Jennifer Lee stated that sound played a huge part in making the film "visceral" and "transported"; she explained, "[i]n letting it tell the story emotionally, the sound of the ice when it's at its most dangerous just makes you shudder." The complete silence at the climax of the film right after Anna freezes was Lasseter's idea, one he "really wanted". In that scene, even the ambient sound that would normally be there was taken out in order to make it feel unusual. Lee explained "that was a moment where we wanted everything to feel suspended."

To obtain certain snow and ice sound effects, sound designer Odin Benitez traveled to Mammoth Mountain, California, to record them at a frozen lake. However, the foley work for the film was recorded on the foley stage on the Warner Bros. Pictures lot by a Warner Bros. crew. Because the film's visuals were finalized so late, five separate versions of nearly every footstep on snow were recorded (corresponding to five different types of snow), then one was later selected during mixing to match the snow as rendered in the final version of each scene. One issue that the production team was "particular" about was the sound of Elsa's footsteps in the ice palace, which required eight attempts, including wine glasses on ice and metal knives on ice; they ended up using a mix of three sounds.

Although the vocals, music, sound effects, and almost all the dialogue were all recorded elsewhere, the final re-recording mix to Dolby Atmos format was performed at the Disney lot by David E. Fluhr of Disney Digital Studio Services.

Localization 
Like other Disney media products which are often localized through Disney Character Voices International, Frozen was translated and dubbed into 41 languages (compared with only 15 for The Lion King). A major challenge was to find sopranos capable of matching Menzel's warm vocal tone and three-octave vocal range in their native languages. Rick Dempsey, the unit's senior executive, regarded the process of translating the film as "exceptionally challenging"; he explained, "It's a difficult juggling act to get the right intent of the lyrics and also have it match rhythmically to the music. And then you have to go back and adjust for lip sync! [It]...requires a lot of patience and precision." Lopez explained that they were told by Disney to remove complex wordplay and puns from their songs, to ensure the film was easily translatable and had globally appealing lyrics. For the casting of dubbed versions, Disney required native speakers in order to "ensure that the film feels 'local'." They used Bell and Menzel's voices as their "blueprint" in casting, and tried to match the voices "as much as possible," meaning that they auditioned approximately 200 singers to fill the 41 slots for Elsa alone. For nearly 15 dubbed versions, they cast Elsa's singing and speaking parts separately, since not all vocalists could act the part they were singing. After casting all the other roles for all 41 languages, the international cast ended up including more than 900 people, who voiced their roles through approximately 1,300 recording sessions. The Italian version of the movie was awarded best foreign dubbing worldwide.

Since 2013, some local TV stations and independent studios have been dubbing the movie in their local languages, creating some unofficial dubs. Namely: Albanian, Arabic (TV dub), Karachay-Balkar, Persian and Tagalog.

In September 2022, to coincide with Te Wiki o te Reo Māori (Māori Language Week), a Māori language version of the film produced by Matewa Media was released theatrically in Australia and New Zealand. The film is the third Māori language adaptation after Moana in 2017, and The Lion King Reo Māori in June 2022. Much of the dialogue of the film is recorded in South Island Māori dialects spoken by Kāi Tahu iwi, to reflect the cold setting of the film.

Release 

Frozen was released theatrically in the United States on November 27, 2013, and it was accompanied by the new Mickey Mouse animated short film, Get a Horse! The film's premiere was at the El Capitan Theatre in Hollywood, California, on November 19, 2013, and had a five-day limited release there, starting from November 22, before going into wide release.

Prior to the film's release, Lopez and Anderson-Lopez's "Let It Go" and "In Summer" were previewed at the 2013 D23 Expo; Idina Menzel performed the former live on stage. A teaser trailer was released on June 18, 2013, followed by the release of the official trailer on September 26, 2013. Frozen was also promoted heavily at several Disney theme parks including Disneyland's Fantasyland, Disney California Adventure's World of Color, Epcot's Norway pavilion, and Disneyland Paris' Disney Dreams! show; Disneyland and Epcot both offered meet-and-greet sessions involving the film's two main characters, Anna and Elsa. On November 6, 2013, Disney Consumer Products began releasing a line of toys and other merchandise relating to the film in Disney Store and other retailers.

On January 31, 2014, a sing-along version of Frozen was released in 2,057 theaters in the United States. It featured on-screen lyrics, and viewers were invited to follow the bouncing snowflake and sing along with the songs from the film. After its wide release in Japan on March 14, 2014, a similar sing-along version of Frozen was released in the country in select theaters on April 26. In Japanese-dubbed versions, Japanese lyrics of the songs appeared on screen for audiences to sing along with the characters. A sing-along version of the film was released in United Kingdom on November 28, 2014.

Home media 
Frozen was released for digital download on February 25, 2014, on Google Play, the iTunes Store, and Amazon Video. It was subsequently released by Walt Disney Studios Home Entertainment on Blu-ray Disc and DVD on March 18, 2014. Bonus features for the Blu-ray release include "The Making of Frozen", a three-minute musical production about how the film was made, "D'frosted", an inside look at how Disney tried to adapt the original fairy tale into an animated feature, four deleted scenes with introduction by the directors, the original theatrical short Get a Horse!, the film's teaser trailer, and "Let It Go" (End Credit Version) music videos by Demi Lovato, Martina Stoessel, and Marsha Milan Londoh; while the DVD release includes the Get a Horse! theatrical short, "Let It Go" musical videos and the film's teaser trailer.

On its first day of release on Blu-ray and DVD, Frozen sold 3.2 million units, becoming one of the biggest home video sellers in the last decade, as well as Amazon's best-selling children's disc of all time. The digital download release of the film also set a record as the fastest-selling digital release of all time. Frozen finished its first week at No. 1 in unit sales in the United States, selling more than three times as many units as other 19 titles in the charts combined, according to the Nielsen's sales chart. The film sold 3,969,270 Blu-ray units (the equivalent of $79,266,322) during its first week, which accounted for 50 percent of its opening home media sales. It topped the U.S. home video sales charts for six non-consecutive weeks out of seven weeks of release, . In the United Kingdom, Frozen debuted at No. 1 in Blu-ray and DVD sales on the Official Video Chart. According to Official Charts Company, more than 500,000 copies of the film were sold in its two-day opening (March 31 – April 1, 2014). During its three first weeks of release in the United Kingdom, Frozen sold more than 1.45 million units, becoming the biggest-selling video title of 2014 so far in the country. Frozen has sold 2,025,000 Blu-ray Disc/DVD combo sets in Japan in 4 weeks, becoming the fastest-selling home video to sell 2 million copies, beating the previous record of 11 weeks by Spirited Away. Frozen also holds the records for highest number of home video units sold on the first official day of sales and in the first official week of sales in Japan. As of the end of 2014, the film earned $308,026,545 in total US home media sales. It is one of the best-selling home media releases, having moved over 18 million units . , Frozen is the biggest-selling Blu-ray in the United States of all-time with over 7.5 million units sold, narrowly beating Avatar.

Following an announcement on August 12, 2014, a sing-along reissue of Frozen was released via DVD and digital download on November 18, 2014.

Frozen was re-released on Ultra HD Blu-ray and 4K digital download on October 1, 2019.

Lawsuit against Phase 4 Films 

In late December 2013, The Walt Disney Company filed a trademark infringement lawsuit in California federal court against Phase 4 Films, seeking an injunction against the continued distribution of the Canadian film The Legend of Sarila, which had been retitled Frozen Land in the United States and had a logo similar to the Disney film. By late January 2014, the two companies had settled the case; the settlement stated that the distribution and promotion of The Legend of Sarila and related merchandise must use its original title and Phase 4 must not use trademarks, logos or other designs confusingly similar to Disney's animated release. Phase 4 was also required to pay Disney $100,000 before January 27, 2014, and make "all practicable efforts" to remove copies of Frozen Land from stores and online distributors before March 3, 2014.

Reception

Box office 
Frozen earned $400.7 million in North America, and an estimated $880 million in other countries, for a worldwide total of $1,280,802,282. Calculating in all expenses, Deadline Hollywood estimated that the film made a profit of over $400 million. It became the fifth-highest-grossing film, the highest-grossing animated film, the highest-grossing 2013 film, the third highest-grossing Walt Disney Pictures release, and the 8th-highest-grossing film distributed by Disney. The film earned $110.6 million worldwide in its opening weekend. On March 2, 2014, its 101st day of release, it surpassed the $1 billion mark, becoming the eighteenth film in cinematic history, the seventh Disney-distributed film, the fifth non-sequel film, the second Disney-distributed film in 2013 (after Iron Man 3), and the first animated film since Toy Story 3 to do so.

Bloomberg Business reported in March 2014 that outside analysts had projected the film's total cost at somewhere around $323 million to $350 million for production, marketing, and distribution, and had also projected that the film would generate $1.3 billion in revenue from box office ticket sales, digital downloads, discs, and television rights.

North America 
Frozen became Fandango's top advance ticket seller among original animated films, ahead of previous record-holder Brave, and became the top-selling animated film in the company's history in late January 2014. The sing-along version of the film later topped the best-selling list of the movie ticketing service again for three days. Frozen opened on Friday, November 22, 2013, exclusively at the El Capitan Theatre in Hollywood for a five-day limited release and earned $342,839 before its wide opening on Wednesday, November 27, 2013. During the three-day weekend it earned $243,390, scoring the seventh-largest per-theater average. On the opening day of its wide release, the film earned $15.2 million, including $1.2 million from Tuesday late-night shows, and set a record for the highest pre-Thanksgiving Wednesday opening, ahead of Tangled ($11.9 million). It was also the second-largest pre-Thanksgiving Wednesday among all films, behind Catching Fire ($20.8 million). The film finished in second place over the traditional three-day weekend (Friday-to-Sunday) with $67.4 million, setting an opening weekend record among Walt Disney Animation Studios films. It also scored the second-largest opening weekend among films that did not debut at #1. Female audiences accounted for 57% of Frozens total audiences on the first weekend, while family audiences held a proportion of 81%. Among films that opened during Thanksgiving, it set new records; three-day ($67.4 million from Friday to Sunday) and five-day ($93.6 million from Wednesday to Sunday). It also achieved the second-largest three-day and five-day Thanksgiving gross among all films, behind Catching Fire.

During its second weekend of wide release, Frozen declined 53% to $31.6 million, but jumped to first place, setting a record for the largest post-Thanksgiving weekend, ahead of Toy Story 2 ($27.8 million). Frozen became the first film since Avatar to reach first place in its sixth weekend of wide release. It remained in the top 10 at the box office for sixteen consecutive weekends (the longest run by any film since 2002) and achieved large weekend grosses from its fifth to its twelfth weekend (of wide release), compared to other films in their respective weekends. On April 25, 2014, Frozen became the nineteenth film to gross $400 million in North America and the fifteenth to do so without a major re-release.

In North America, Frozen is the twenty-sixth-highest-grossing film, the third-highest-grossing 2013 film, the fifth-highest-grossing animated film, the highest-grossing 2013 animated film, the twelfth-highest-grossing 3-D film, and the second-highest-grossing Walt Disney Animation Studios film. Excluding re-releases, it has the highest-grossing initial run among non-sequel animated films (a record previously held by Finding Nemo) and among Walt Disney Animation Studios films (a record previously held by The Lion King). Box Office Mojo estimates that the film sold over 49 million tickets in North America.

Outside North America 
Frozen is the fifth-highest-grossing film, the highest-grossing animated film, and the highest-grossing 2013 film.  It is the highest-grossing animated film in South Korea, Denmark, and Venezuela. It is also the highest-grossing Walt Disney Animation Studios film in more than 45 territories, including the Latin America region (specifically in Mexico and Brazil), the UK, Ireland, and Malta, Russia and the CIS, Ukraine, Norway, Malaysia, Singapore, Australia and China.

The film made its debut outside North America on the same weekend as its wide North American release and earned $16.7 million from sixteen markets. It topped the box office outside North America for two weekends in 2014; January 10–12 ($27.8 million) and February 7–9 ($24 million). Overall, its largest opening weekends occurred in China (five-day opening of $14.3 million), Russia and the CIS ($11.9 million, including previews from previous weekend), where the film set an opening weekend record among Disney animated films (ahead of Tangled), and Japan (three-day opening of $9.73 million). It set an opening weekend record among animated films in Sweden. In total earnings, the film's top market after North America is Japan ($247.6 million), followed by South Korea ($76.6 million) and the United Kingdom, Ireland and Malta ($65.7 million). In South Korea, Frozen is the second-largest foreign film both in terms of attendance and gross, the largest Disney release and the first animated film to earn more than ten million admissions. In Japan, it is the third-highest-grossing film of all time, the second-highest-grossing imported film (behind Titanic) and the highest-grossing Disney film. It topped the country's box office for sixteen consecutive weekends until being surpassed by another Disney release, Maleficent.

Commercial analysis 
Ray Subers, writing for Box Office Mojo, compared the film to Disney's 2010 animated feature Tangled by saying that the film's story was not as "immediately interesting" and that "marketing has yet to sell this to boys the way Tangled did". Noting that the 2013 holiday season (Thanksgiving and Christmas) lacked compelling content for families, Subers predicted that the film would "play well all the way through Christmas" and end up grossing $185 million in North America (similar to Wreck-It Ralph). Boxoffice noted the success of previous Disney's animated films released during the holiday season (Tangled and Wreck-It Ralph), but argued that the cast might not attract audiences due to the lack of major stars. They issued a $170,000,000 North America box office forecast for the film. Chris Agar from ScreenRant expressed a similar opinion; he cited a string of recent box office successes of the studio, and thought that Frozen would fill a void of kid-friendly films in the marketplace, but did not expect it to surpass Catching Fire in terms of box office gross.

Clayton Dillard of Slant Magazine commented that while the trailers made the film seem "pallid," positive critical reviews could attract interest from both "core demographics" and adult audiences, and therefore he believed Frozen stood a good chance of surpassing Tangleds Thanksgiving three-day opening record. Brad Brevet of Ropeofsilicon.com described the film's marketing as a "severely hit and miss" campaign, which could affect its box office performance. After Frozen finished its first weekend with a record $93.6 million during Thanksgiving, most box-office watchers predicted that it would end up grossing between $250 and $300 million in North America. At the time, Box Office Mojo reissued a $250 million box office gross prediction for North America. Box Office Mojo noted that it would be "the exclusive choice for family audiences" and attributed its successful opening to strong word-of-mouth and the studio's marketing, which highlighted the connection between Frozen and Disney's previous successful releases like Tangled and Wreck-It Ralph, as well as the elements of humor.

When Frozen became a box office success, Bilge Ebiri of Vulture analyzed the film's elements and suggested eight factors that might have led to its success. He thought Frozen managed to capture the spirit of the Disney Renaissance films and early Disney features such as Snow White and the Seven Dwarfs and Cinderella. He also wrote that the film has Olaf, a "wisecracking, irreverent" sidekick with mild humor which is "a requirement of modern animated kids' movies," and its "witty, catchy" songs were "pretty good." Furthermore, Ebiri noted that Frozen was a "revisionist" film that didn't "have a typical villain"; Elsa, the person who should be the villain didn't turn out to be a villain, but "a girl who's having trouble." She was the one who "[created] most of the challenges [for] the film's more typical heroes – Princess Anna." The story of two sisters who were separated as they grew up held real-life overtones for many audience members who had siblings, and the struggle of Elsa to overcome the shame and fear of her powers was also relatable. Finally, he identified several factors which he believed attracted female audiences: two strong female characters; a twist on the usual romantic subplot, when the traditional "Prince Charming" – Hans – turned out to be a gold-digging villain; and the "act of true love" which saved Anna was her own sacrifice in saving Elsa.

Scott Davis of Forbes credited the film's commercial success to its marketing aimed at both sexes, and to the success of its soundtrack.

The commercial success of Frozen in Japan was considered to be a phenomenon which received widespread media coverage. Released in that market as Anna and the Snow Queen, the film increased its gross each week in its three first weeks of release, and only started to drop in the fourth; while other films usually peak in the opening week and decline in the latter ones. Frozen has received over 7 million admissions in Japan as of April 16, and nearly 18.7 million admissions as of June 23. Many cinemagoers were reported to have watched both the original and the Japanese-dubbed version. Japan Today also reported that the local dubbed version was "particularly popular" in the country. Gavin J. Blair of The Hollywood Reporter commented on the film's earnings in Japan: "Even after its $9.6 million (￥986.4 million) three-day opening, a record bow for a Disney animation in Japan, few would have predicted the kind of numbers Frozen has now racked up." Disney's head of distribution Dave Hollis said in an interview that "It's become very clear that the themes and emotions of Frozen transcend geography, but what's going on in Japan is extraordinary."

According to Akira Lippit of the USC School of Cinematic Arts, there were several factors that constituted this phenomenon: besides the fact that animated films "are held in great regard in Japan, and the Disney brand name with all of its heritage is extremely valuable", "the biggest reason is the primary audience ... 13- to 17-year-old teenage girls." He further explained that audiences of this age range have a vital role in shaping Japanese pop culture and "Frozen has so many elements that appeal to them, with its story of a young girl with power and mystique, who finds her own sort of good in herself." He compared the film's current situation with a similar phenomenon which occurred with Titanic in 1997, "when millions of Japanese teen girls turned out to watch Leonard[o] DiCaprio go under – several times," and thought the same would happen with Frozen. Another reason that contributed to the film's success in the market was that Disney took great care in choosing the voice actors for the Japanese-dubbed version, since Japan's pop music scene had an important role particularly with teenage audiences. Orika Hiromura, Disney Japan's marketing project leader for Frozen, said in an interview with The Wall Street Journal: "We really put effort into finding actors who could not only play the role but also belt out the tunes as well. We found the perfect match in Takako Matsu and Sayaka Kanda, and they really added a whole new dimension to the storytelling."

When asked about the success of Frozen, director Chris Buck stated: "We never expected anything like this. We just hoped to make a movie that did as well as Tangled! I hoped the audience would embrace it and respond to it, but there's no way we could have predicted this." He cited a number of reasons for the film's popularity: "There are characters that people relate to; the songs are so strong and memorable. We also have some flawed characters, which is what Jen[nifer Lee] and I like to do – we essentially create two imperfect princesses." As Frozen approached the first anniversary of its release, Menzel mentioned the film's continuing popularity in an October 2014 interview: "It's just a remarkable thing. Usually you do a project and it has its moment. This just feels like it keeps going."

Critical response 
Frozen opened to positive reviews, with several critics comparing it favorably to the films of the Disney Renaissance, particularly The Little Mermaid, Beauty and the Beast, Aladdin, and The Lion King. Some journalists felt that the film's success marked a second Disney Renaissance. The film was praised for its visuals, themes, musical numbers, screenplay, and vocal performances, especially those of Bell, Menzel, and Gad. The "Let It Go" musical sequence was also particularly praised by critics. Its critical consensus reads: "Beautifully animated, smartly written, and stocked with singalong songs, Frozen adds another worthy entry to the Disney canon." Metacritic, which determines a rating out of 100 from the reviews of mainstream critics, calculated a score of 74 based on 43 reviews, indicating "generally favorable reviews." Audiences polled by CinemaScore gave the film a rare "A+" grade on an A+ to F scale. Surveys conducted by Fandango among 1,000 ticket buyers revealed that 75% of purchasers had seen the film at least once, and 52% had seen it twice. It was also pointed out that 55% of audiences identified "Let It Go" as their favorite song, while "Do You Want to Build a Snowman?" and "For the First Time in Forever" held proportions of 21% and 9%, respectively. Frozen was named the seventh-best film of 2013 by Richard Corliss of Time and Kyle Smith of the New York Post.

Alonso Duralde of TheWrap wrote that the film is "the best animated musical to come out of Disney since the tragic death of lyricist Howard Ashman, whose work on The Little Mermaid and Beauty and the Beast helped build the studio's modern animated division into what it is today." He also said that "while it lags the tiniest bit on its way to the conclusion, the script... really delivers; it offers characters to care about, along with some nifty twists and surprises along the way." Todd McCarthy of The Hollywood Reporter observed Frozen as a true musical and wrote, "You can practically see the Broadway musical Frozen is destined to become while watching Disney's 3D animated princess tale." McCarthy described the film as "energetic, humorous and not too cloying, as well as the first Hollywood film in many years to warn of global cooling rather than warming, this tuneful toon upgrades what has been a lackluster year for big studio animated fare and, beginning with its Thanksgiving opening, should live up to box office expectations as one of the studio's hoped-for holiday-spanning blockbusters." Scott Mendelson of Forbes wrote, "Frozen is both a declaration of Disney's renewed cultural relevance and a reaffirmation of Disney coming to terms with its own legacy and its own identity. It's also a just plain terrific bit of family entertainment."

The Los Angeles Times extolled the film's ensemble voice talent and elaborate musical sequences, and declared Frozen was "a welcome return to greatness for Walt Disney Animation Studios." Entertainment Weeklys Owen Gleiberman gave the film a "B+" grade and labeled it as a "squarely enchanting fairy tale that shows you how the definition of what's fresh in animation can shift." Richard Corliss of Time stated that: "It's great to see Disney returning to its roots and blooming anew: creating superior musical entertainment that draws on the Walt [Disney] tradition of animation splendor and the verve of Broadway present." Richard Roeper wrote that the film was an "absolute delight from start to finish." Both Michael Phillips of Chicago Tribune and Stephen Holden of The New York Times praised the film's characters and musical sequences, which also drew comparisons to the theatrics found in Wicked. Emma Dibdin of Digital Spy awarded the film five out of five stars and called the film "a new Disney classic" and "an exhilarating, joyous, human story that's as frequently laugh-out-loud funny as it is startling and daring and poignant. Hot on the heels of the 90th anniversary, it's impossible to imagine a more perfect celebration of everything Disney is at its best." Frozen was also praised in Norwegian Sámi media as showcasing Sámi culture to a broad audience in a good way. Composer Frode Fjellheim was lauded by Norwegian Sámi President Aili Keskitalo for his contributions to the film, during the President's 2014 New Year's speech.

Scott Foundas of Variety was less impressed with the film, describing it as "formulaic", though he praised its voice acting and technical artistry: "The tactile, snow-capped Arendelle landscape, including Elsa's ice-castle retreat is Frozens other true marvel, enhanced by 3D and the decision to shoot in widescreen – a nod to the CinemaScope richness of Sleeping Beauty and Lady and the Tramp... That's almost but not quite enough to make up for the somewhat slack plotting and the generic nature of the main characters. Neither princess here is a patch on Tangleds babe-in-the-woods Rapunzel, while both Hans and Kristoff are cut from pretty standard-issue hero cloth until a reasonably surprising third-act twist somewhat ups the ante. Only Olaf is unimpeachable: Get this snowman a spinoff feature to call his own." The Seattle Times gave the film two out of four stars, stating "While it is an often gorgeous film with computer-generated fjords and ice sculptures and castle interiors, the important thing that glues all this stuff together – story – is sadly lacking." Joe Williams of the St. Louis Post-Dispatch also criticized the story as the film's weakest point. Writing on Roger Ebert's website, Christy Lemire gave a mixed review in which she awarded two-and-a-half stars out of four. Lemire praised the visuals and the performance of "Let It Go," as well as the positive messages Frozen sends. However, she referred to the film as "cynical" and criticized it as an "attempt to shake things up without shaking them up too much." She also noted the similarity between Elsa and another well-known fictional female who unleashes paranormal powers when agitated, Carrie White.

Controversies

Portrayal of emotions 
Allegations of sexism occurred following a statement by Lino DiSalvo, the film's head of animation, who said to Fan Voice's Jenna Busch: "Historically speaking, animating female characters are really, really difficult, because they have to go through these range of emotions, but you have to keep them pretty." However, a Disney spokesperson later told Time that DiSalvo's quote was widely misinterpreted, stating that he was "describing some technical aspects of CG animation and not making a general comment on animating females versus males or other characters." Director Lee also said that DiSalvo's words were recklessly taken out of context, and that he was talking in very technical terms about CG animation. "It is hard no matter what the gender is. I felt horrible for him," she said. In an August 2014 interview, DiSalvo re-emphasized what he had been trying to explain all along when his statements were taken out of context – the difficulty with turning any kind of animated character from a series of sketches on a 2D emotion model sheet into a properly rigged 3D character model: "Translating that emotional range onto a CG character is one of the most difficult parts of the process. Male. Female. Snowman. Animal." He added, "The really sad thing is people took that ... catchy headline and they just repopulated it everywhere. People didn't get back to me for comments and the sad thing is that's the way the internet works. They don't want the truth."

Perceived LGBT parallels 
A few conservative Christian commentators decried the film as promoting homosexuality, saying the themes of Elsa's being different from others, her ostracism from society, and her independence and rejection of male suitors, are metaphors for lesbianism. Elsa's song "Let it Go" has been compared to the phenomenon of coming out of the closet. Other viewers argued that Elsa represents a role model for LGBT youth. These claims were met with mixed reactions from both audiences and the LGBT community.Akash Nikolas writes in The Atlantic that Disney films including Frozen have long "subtly appeal[ed] to queer children" through protagonists who are often social outcasts set apart by unusual desires and who reject traditional expectations of marriage. In Film International, Robert Geal writes that while the film offers a superficially progressive vision of homosexuality, it also perpetuates conservative notions about sexuality and gender: whereas Elsa's female homosexuality is rendered visually pleasurable to a male gaze, male transgressions of heterosexuality are coded in various negative ways.When asked about perceived homosexual undertones in the film, Lee was noncommittal, stating, "I don't like to say anything [...] let the fans talk. I think it's up to them", but that the film should have a "2013 point of view", in contrast to films from earlier eras.

"Let it Go" lawsuit 
On November 24, 2017, musical artist Jaime Ciero sued Demi Lovato, Idina Menzel, Walt Disney Animation Studios and others involved with the song "Let it Go," accusing them of ripping off his 2008 single "Volar." In May 2018, it was ruled in court that the original songwriters, Bobby Lopez and Kristen Anderson-Lopez, would be released from the lawsuit due to the three-year statute of limitations for copyright claims. Because each replay or new performance of the song restarts the statute of limitations clock, Ciero was told he could amend his original complaint to address only those infringements within the three-year timeframe. Ciero dropped the suit in May 2019.

Accolades 

At the 86th Academy Awards, Frozen received awards for Best Animated Feature, the first for Walt Disney Animation Studios, and Best Original Song. The film's other nominations include ten Annie Awards (winning five), a British Academy Film Award (which it won), two Critics' Choice Movie Awards (winning both), and two Golden Globe Awards (winning one).

Legacy

Cultural impact 

During the spring and summer of 2014, several journalists observed that Frozen was unusually catchy in comparison to the vast majority of films, in that many children in both the U.S. and the U.K. were watching Frozen so many times that they now knew all the songs by heart and kept singing them again and again at every opportunity, to the distress of their hapless parents, teachers, and classmates. Those who have disclosed that they are the parent of a Frozen-obsessed child include former UK prime minister David Cameron, as well as actors Amy Adams, Ben Affleck, Kevin Costner, and Vince Vaughn. When Terry Gross brought up this phenomenon with songwriters Lopez and Anderson-Lopez in an April 2014 interview on NPR, they explained there was simply no way they could have known how popular their work on Frozen would become. They were "just trying to tell a story that resonated" and "that didn't suck."

In May, columnist Joel Stein of Time magazine wrote about his young son Laszlo's frustration with the inescapable "cultural assault" of Frozen at preschool and all social and extracurricular activities, and how he had arranged for a Skype call with lead actress Bell after Laszlo began asking why the film was made. When Laszlo asked whether Bell knew when she made Frozen that it would take over kids' lives, she replied: "I did not know that people would not let it go. No pun intended." In a December 2014 interview with The Hollywood Reporter, Lee acknowledged that she had transitioned from thanking people when they expressed their appreciation for Frozen to having to apologize when they said "we're still listening to those songs" (with their children). Lee also said that she used the film and its strong female characters to inspire her own daughter, who had experienced bullying at school, and admitted that she herself as a child was bullied as well; thus, they had managed to be true to themselves like Anna and Elsa.

In a 2014 mid-year report of the 100 most-used baby names conducted by BabyCenter, 'Elsa' was ranked 88; it was the first time the name had appeared on the site's chart. Sarah Barrett, managing director of the site, explained that while the film's popular heroine is called Anna, "Elsa offers a more unique name and is also a strong female role model." Many parents revealed that their choices of name were "heavily influenced" by the siblings. Vice president of Disney UK Anna Hill later commented that "We're delighted that Elsa is a popular name for babies and it's lovely to hear that for many families, it is actually their siblings who have chosen it," and that "Elsa's fight to overcome her fears and the powerful strength of the family bond" were relatable to many families. On 2014 year-end lists issued by Google, Frozen was the most searched movie of 2014. On the Google Play Store, Frozen and its soundtrack album were also named 'Movie of the Year' and 'Album of the Year', respectively, i.e. the best-selling title in their respective areas. Frozen was also the second-most illegally downloaded film title of 2014 via BitTorrent file sharing protocol, with around 30 million downloads.

After Disney announced in March 2015 that a feature-length sequel was in development, Agence France-Presse and the Toronto Star both published stories gently mocking the horror of parents everywhere at the news that another Frozen "sensory and financial assault" was in the pipeline.

The Writers Guild Foundation listed Frozen as having one of the best scripts of 2010s film and television, praising the film as one that subverts "rigidly established story and character tropes".

Franchise 

In January 2014, Iger announced that Frozen would be adapted into a Broadway stage musical. In the space of a single business quarter, Iger went from speaking of Frozens "franchise potential" (in February 2014) to saying that it was "probably" one of Disney's "top five franchises" (in May 2014). The film's massive popularity resulted in an unusually severe merchandise shortage in the United States and several other industrialized countries in April 2014, which caused resale prices for higher-quality limited-edition Frozen dolls and costumes to skyrocket past $1,000 on eBay. By the time the merchandise shortage was finally resolved in early November 2014 (nearly a year after the film's release), Disney had sold over three million Frozen costumes in North America alone. Wait times for the meet-and-greets at Disney Parks soon regularly exceeded four hours and forced management in February 2014 to indefinitely extend what was originally intended as a temporary film promotion. Disney Parks later put on a temporary event (Frozen Summer Fun) at Disney's Hollywood Studios, then announced on September 12, 2014, that the Maelstrom ride at Epcot's Norway pavilion would be closed and replaced with a Frozen-based attraction, which opened in early 2016. On May 27, 2016, a live Frozen musical stage show officially opened at the Hyperion Theater in Disney California Adventure, replacing the venue's previous show, Aladdin. By August 2014, the publisher Random House had sold over 8 million Frozen-related books. Tour operators, including Adventures by Disney, added more Norway tours in response to rising demand during 2014.

Meanwhile, the producers of Once Upon a Time (made by Disney-owned ABC Studios) independently conceived of and obtained authorization from both ABC and Disney for a Frozen-inspired crossover story arc in the show's fourth season, which was first revealed at the end of the show's third season in May 2014, and premiered in September 2014. On September 2, 2014, ABC broadcast The Story of Frozen: Making a Disney Animated Classic, a one-hour "making of" television special. At the end of the special, Lasseter announced that the production team would be reuniting to make Frozen Fever, a short film which debuted in theaters with Disney's Cinderella on March 13, 2015. On September 4, 2014, Feld Entertainment's Disney on Ice presented the world premiere of a touring ice skating show based on the film at Amway Center in Orlando, Florida.

In the world builder game Disney Magic Kingdoms, during a limited time 2016 event focusing on Frozen, Anna, Elsa, Olaf, Kristoff, Sven and Hans were included as playable characters, along with some attractions based on locations of the film.

During the airing of The Making of Frozen: Return to Arendelle on ABC, it was announced that a holiday special titled Olaf's Frozen Adventure was in-production, slated for release in winter 2017. It was later revealed by John Lasseter in June 2017 that the 21-minute special would instead receive a limited time theatrical release. It premiered in theaters with Pixar's Coco on November 22, 2017, and made its television debut on ABC on December 14, 2017.

In addition, Arendelle was featured as a world in the 2019 video game Kingdom Hearts III, which adapts the plot of the film. The film's voice cast reprise their roles for the game.

Sequels 

A sequel, Frozen II, was released in November 2019. In the film's plot, Anna, Elsa, Kristoff, Sven, and Olaf travel to an enchanted forest to unravel the origin of Elsa's magical power. The film was a financial success, surpassing the box office of Frozen, but proved more divisive with critics.

Disney's CEO Bob Iger announced on February 8, 2023, that Frozen III is currently in the works at Walt Disney Animation Studios.

See also 
 List of Disney animated films based on fairy tales
 List of Disney theatrical animated feature films

Notes

References

Further reading

External links 

 
 
 
 
 
 
 Frozen at Walt Disney Animation Studios

2010s American animated films
2010s English-language films
2010s musical fantasy films
2013 3D films
2013 computer-animated films
2013 directorial debut films
2013 fantasy films
3D animated films
American 3D films
American animated feature films
American computer-animated films
American musical fantasy films
Animated drama films
American animated fantasy films
Animated films about sisters
Animated musical films
Annie Award winners
Best Animated Feature Academy Award winners
Best Animated Feature Annie Award winners
Best Animated Feature BAFTA winners
Best Animated Feature Broadcast Film Critics Association Award winners
Best Animated Feature Film Golden Globe winners
Disney controversies
Film controversies in the United States
Films about curses
Films about princesses
Films about trolls
Films directed by Chris Buck
Films directed by Jennifer Lee (filmmaker)
Films produced by Peter Del Vecho
Films scored by Christophe Beck
Films set in castles
Films set in palaces
Films set in Scandinavia
Films that won the Best Original Song Academy Award
Films with screenplays by Jennifer Lee (filmmaker)
Frozen (franchise) mass media
LGBT-related controversies in animation
LGBT-related controversies in film
Walt Disney Animation Studios films
Walt Disney Pictures animated films